Tamara Rey (born Tamara Camille Fernandez 19 February 1989) is a Cuban American actress and writer.

Personal life
Rey was raised in Sugar Land, Texas by her mother and father. She has one older sister, Renee, a graphic designer who lives in Austin, Texas. Her younger sister, Sabrina, is a nurse.

Before moving to Los Angeles, Rey became an active member of the Chi Omega fraternity and attended the University of Texas at Austin, majoring in Radio, Television and Film.

Career 
Rey started her career using the name Tamara Camille in CSI: Crime Scene Investigation.  In 2011, Rey landed a role in the How I Met Your Mother episode "The Exploding Meatball Sub".

Since moving to Los Angeles, she has starred in television shows such as Parenthood and Shameless, along with feature films including Best Friends Forever, and Fight to the Finish.

Filmography

References

External links 
 Official website
 

Moody College of Communication alumni
People from Sugar Land, Texas
American television actresses
1989 births
Living people
21st-century American women